The 2016 Prosperita Open was a professional tennis tournament played on clay courts. It was the 13th edition of the tournament which was part of the 2016 ATP Challenger Tour. It took place in Ostrava, Czech Republic between 25 April and 1 May.

Singles main-draw entrants

Seeds

 1 Rankings are as of April 18, 2016

Other entrants
The following players received wildcards into the singles main draw:
  Zdeněk Kolář
  David Poljak
  Dominik Sproch
  Janko Tipsarević

The following players received entry from the qualifying draw:
  Marek Michalička 
  Andrej Martin 
  Jaroslav Pospíšil 
  Stefano Napolitano

Champions

Singles
 
 Constant Lestienne def.  Zdeněk Kolář, 6–7(5–7), 6–1, 6–2

Doubles

 Sander Arends /  Tristan-Samuel Weissborn def.  Lukáš Dlouhý /  Hans Podlipnik, 7–6(10–8), 6–7(4–7), [10–5]

References
 Combo Main Draw

External links
Official Website

Prosperita Open
Prosperita Open
Prosperita
Prosperita Open
Prosperita Open